Victoria and Albert refers to Queen Victoria and her husband, Prince Albert of Saxe-Coburg-Gotha.

It may also refer to:

The Victoria and Albert Museum in London
, a Royal Yacht
, a Royal Yacht
, a Royal Yacht
Dr. Bhau Daji Lad Museum, the oldest museum in Mumbai, India, formerly the Victoria and Albert Museum
Electoral district of Victoria and Albert, an electorate in South Australia
Victoria & Albert's, a restaurant at Disney's Grand Floridian Resort & Spa

As well as the following television series:
Albert and Victoria, aired 1970–1971
Victoria & Albert (TV serial), aired 2001

See also

William and Mary (disambiguation)